"Belly Full of Turkey" is the ninth episode in the first season of the television series How I Met Your Mother. It originally aired on November 21, 2005.

Plot 
Marshall and Lily visit Marshall's family in St. Cloud, Minnesota for Thanksgiving. Marshall plays a game of "bask-ice-ball" (a no-rules, brawling combination of basketball and ice hockey that the Eriksen family invented) with his father and older brothers while Lily helps her future sister-in-law and mother-in-law in the kitchen. The talk turns to babies, and Mrs. Eriksen reveals that her first-born son was abnormally almost fifteen pounds at birth; this frightens Lily, who is dwarfed not only by Marshall, the shortest of his brothers at 6'4", but his entire family, and she fears the idea of trying to give birth to at least one baby that size.

At dinner, Lily gets into an argument with Marshall and the Eriksens when she reveals she does not want to either change her surname after the wedding, nor raise their kids in Minnesota. Increasingly worked up, she drives off to a convenience store, where she is arrested for public urination. Marshall goes to the station, and finds out Lily was using a home pregnancy test. Lily tells him of her concerns about raising a family of "mayonnaise-guzzling giants in Minnesota", but Marshall, faced with the very real possibility of having a child, assures her that they will not settle down in Minnesota, and alleviates Lily's fears. Suddenly an officer walks in and holds out Lily's possessions, which includes the pregnancy test. They find out that Lily is not pregnant and they return to the Eriksen home, much relieved, and the Thanksgiving dinner concludes amicably.

Meanwhile, Robin and Ted have no plans for Thanksgiving, and decide to help out at a soup kitchen. When they arrive, they are shocked to find Barney volunteering there already, highly regarded as one of the best volunteers on staff. The organizer tells Ted and Robin that they have enough volunteers, but after being vouched for by Barney, they are allowed to help. Soon after, they find out that not all the food received as donations to the soup kitchen is actually distributed to the needy; many volunteers selfishly take the better, more expensive donations for themselves. When Ted complains to Barney about this, he discovers that Barney has been working there as mandatory community service after being arrested for public urination on the judge's church, but has since continued and become the volunteer of the year.

Ted, determined to be selfless, begins to distribute the rare food items to the needy, which results in him, Robin, and Barney being kicked out of the kitchen. To make it up to an irate Barney, Ted and Robin take him to the strip club, the Lusty Leopard, where Ted pays for a homeless man to get a lap dance, which he realizes is the one act of charity he performed on Thanksgiving. Another stripper named Tracy (Katie A. Keane) introduces herself to Ted and compliments him on his generosity, and Ted tells his kids that is "the story of how I met your mother", shocking them before Ted reveals, to their relief, that he is joking.

Foreshadowing
 Ted's kids are shocked when, after telling them of his meeting a stripper named Tracy, he says "And that, kids, is the true story of how I met your mother." Although he was joking, this led many fans to believe that The Mother's real name was Tracy based on his kids' shocked reactions. It was confirmed in the series finale that Ted's wife's name is Tracy.

Reception 
According to statistics gathered by USDISH it is one of the most popular TV show episodes during the holiday season.

References

External links 
 

2005 American television episodes
How I Met Your Mother (season 1) episodes
Thanksgiving television episodes